Tikhol Dam is an earth-fill dam on Kalu river in Tikhol village in Parner taluka of Ahmednagar district of state of Maharashtra in India.

Specifications

Purpose
 Irrigation
 Drinking water for neatest villages

See also
 Dams in Maharashtra

References

Dams in Ahmednagar district
Dams completed in 1975
Earth-filled dams
1975 establishments in Maharashtra